Harold Harper may refer to:

Harold Harper, character in The Bedford Diaries
Harold Harper, character in El Laberinto de Alicia

See also
Harry Harper (disambiguation)
Harold Harper Bennett